The Australasian Performing Right Association Awards of 2011 (generally known as APRA Awards) are a series of related awards which include the APRA Music Awards, Art Music Awards, and Screen Music Awards. The APRA Music Awards of 2011 was the 29th annual ceremony by the Australasian Performing Right Association (APRA) and the Australasian Mechanical Copyright Owners Society (AMCOS) to award outstanding achievements in contemporary songwriting, composing and publishing. The ceremony was held on 21 June 2011 at CarriageWorks in Sydney, Australia. The Art Music Awards were introduced in 2011 to replace the Classical Music Awards (last held in 2009) and were distributed on 3 May. They are sponsored by APRA and the Australian Music Centre (AMC) to "recognise achievement in the composition, performance, education and presentation of Australian music". The Screen Music Awards were issued on 14 November by APRA and Australian Guild of Screen Composers (AGSC) at the City Recital Hall, Sydney which "acknowledges excellence and innovation in the genre of screen composition".

On 26 May nominations for the APRA Music Awards were announced on multiple news sources, with John Butler Trio being the most nominated artist. This ceremony was hosted by comedians Andrew Hansen and Chris Taylor. Also featured in the ceremony were cover versions of nominated works. A total of 12 awards were presented. Paul Kelly was honoured with the Ted Albert Award for Outstanding Services to Australian Music. Angus and Julia Stone tied with Jet for the most awards won that evening, the former winning both the Songwriter of the Year and the Song of the Year awards and the latter winning Most Played Australian Work and Rock Work of the Year for their song "Seventeen".

Performances

APRA Music Awards

Blues & Roots Work of the Year

Breakthrough Songwriter of the Year

Country Work of the Year

Dance Work of the Year

International Work of the Year

Most Played Australian Work

Rock Work of the Year

Song of the Year

Urban Work of the Year

Most Played Australia Work Overseas

Songwriter of the Year
Angus and Julia Stone

Ted Albert Award for Outstanding Services to Australian Music
Paul Kelly

Art Music Awards

Work of the Year – Instrumental

Work of the Year – Jazz

Work of the Year – Orchestral

Work of the Year – Vocal or Choral

Performance of the Year

Award for Excellence by an Organisation or an Individual

Award for Excellence in Music Education

Award for Excellence in a Regional Area

Award for Excellence in Experimental Music

Screen Music Awards

Feature Film Score of the Year

Best Music for an Advertisement

Best Music for Children's Television

Best Music for a Documentary

Best Music for a Mini-Series or Telemovie

Best Music for a Short Film

Best Music for a Television Series or Serial

Best Original Song Composed for the Screen

Best Soundtrack Album

Best Television Theme

Most Performed Screen Composer – Australia

Most Performed Screen Composer – Overseas

Notes

Footnotes

1.  Published by EMI Music Publishing Australia for Catherine Britt; Published by Perfect Pitch Publishing for Melanie Horsnell.
2.  Published by ABC Music Publishing administered by Mushroom Music for Drew McAlister.
3.  Published by Orient Pacific Music for Lee Kernaghan; Published by Universal Music Publishing for Colin Buchanan; Published by Piney Range Publishing for Matthew Scullion; Published by Perfect Pitch Publishing for Garth Porter.
4.  Published by EMI Music Publishing Australia for Brooke McClymont, Mollie McClymont and Samantha McClymont; Published by Sony/ATV Music Publishing Australia for Nathan Chapman.
5.  Published by Sony/ATV Music Publishing Australia for Brian McFadden; Published by EMI Music Publishing Australia for Antonio Egizii and David Musumeci.
6.  Published by EMI Music Publishing Australia for Amy Pearson; Published by PeppermintBlue Publishing administered by Warner Chappell Music Australia for Cameron Denny and Paul Zala.
7.  Published by MCDJ Music/Universal Music Publishing for Ilan Kidron, Jonathan Murphy, David Greene and Justin Shave.
8.  Published by EMI Music Publishing Australia for Calvin Broadus; Published by Kobalt Music Publishing Australia for Katheryn Hudson, Martin Sandberg, Lukasz Gottwald, Bonnie McKee and Benjamin Levin; Published by Warner Chappell Music Australia for Katheryn Hudson; Published by Mushroom Music for Bonnie McKee.
9.  Published by EMI Music Publishing Australia for Alecia Moore; Published by Kobalt Music Publishing Australia for Martin Sandberg and Johan Schuster.
10.  Published by Mushroom Music for Samuel Dixon; Published by EMI Music Publishing Australia for Sia Furler.
11.  Published by Sony/ATV Music Publishing Australia for Barry Francis, Matthew Lambert and Daniel Smith.
12.  Published by Universal Music Publishing for Guy Sebastian; Published by Universal/MCA Music Publishing for Eve Jeffers.
13.  A Dream of Drowning was written in 2009 for the opening concert of West Australian Symphony Orchestra's 2010 season. Teddy Tahu Rhodes sang baritone with the orchestra supplying vibraphone, harmonium, celesta, harp and strings. Andrew Ford composed the work using text from Tim Winton's novel Breath (2008).
14.  Beach Burial was written in 2009 for the Sydney Philharmonia Choirs. Brett Weymark conducted the choirs with the Sydney Philharmonia Orchestra supplying flutes, oboes, clarinets in A, bassoon, contrabassoon, horns in F, trumpets in C, tenor trombones, bass trombone, timpani, strings. Andrew Schultz composed the work using text from Kenneth Slessor's poem of the same name (1944).
15.  Deserts of Exile was written in 2007 for the Elysian Singers, Sydney Chamber Choir and Melbourne Symphony Orchestra Chorus. In 2010 it was performed by the Choir of Trinity College, Cambridge which was conducted by Stephen Layton. Paul Stanhope composed the work using text from Jabra Ibrahim Jabra's poem and excerpts from the Old Testament's Lamentations of Jeremiah.
16.  Iphigenia in Exile was written in 1985 for a music theatre piece in one act. It was performed in 2010 by Deborah Kayser (soprano voice) with nine instrumentalists (piccolo, two clarinets, bass clarinet, mandolin, mandolin guitar, percussion (three players)) and a pre-recorded chorus of six women. Helen Gifford composed the work using text from Richard Meredith's libretto based on Iphigenia in Tauris (414–412 BC) by Euripides.

References

2011 in Australian music
2011 music awards
APRA Awards